Rubus ablatus is a North American species of blackberry in section Arguti of the genus Rubus, a member of the rose family. It is native to the north-central United States from Minnesota south to Missouri and east to Ohio.

References

External links 

ablatus